Vinko Jelovac (alternate spelling: Vinto Jelovac) (born 18 November 1948 in Pazin, SR Croatia, Yugoslavia) is a former Slovenian-Croatian professional basketball player and coach. At a height of 2.08 m (6'10") tall, and a weight of 95 kg (210 lbs.), he played at the center position. Jelovac was named Slovenian Sportsman of the Year, in 1973 and 1974. He was inducted into the Slovenian Athletes Hall of Fame, in 2012.

Club career
During his club career, Jelovac was a long-time player of KK Olimpija. He was a member of the FIBA European Selection, in 1973 and 1974. He won the Yugoslav League championship in 1970.

National team career 
Jelovac competed at the 1972 Summer Olympics, and the 1976 Summer Olympics, with the senior men's Yugoslav national basketball team. He also competed at the FIBA World Cup.

References

External links
FIBA Profile "Vinko Jelovac"
FIBA Profile "Vinto Jelovac"

1948 births
Living people
People from Pazin
Basketball players at the 1972 Summer Olympics
Basketball players at the 1976 Summer Olympics
Croatian basketball coaches
Croatian men's basketball players
KK Cibona coaches
KK Olimpija players
Maccabi Tel Aviv B.C. coaches
Medalists at the 1976 Summer Olympics
Mediterranean Games gold medalists for Yugoslavia
Olympic basketball players of Yugoslavia
Olympic medalists in basketball
Olympic silver medalists for Yugoslavia
Slovenian basketball coaches
Slovenian men's basketball players
Sportspeople from Osijek
Yugoslav men's basketball players
1970 FIBA World Championship players
1974 FIBA World Championship players
Centers (basketball)
FIBA World Championship-winning players
Mediterranean Games medalists in basketball
Competitors at the 1971 Mediterranean Games